Mount Barkow is a mountain, 1,390 m, which stands 20 nautical miles (37 km) west of Court Nunatak and New Bedford Inlet and marks the east end of the ridge separating Haines Glacier and Meinardus Glacier, on the east side of Palmer Land. Discovered and photographed from the air in December 1940 by the United States Antarctic Service (USAS). Photographed from the air by Ronne Antarctic Research Expedition (RARE) under Ronne, who in conjunction with the Falkland Islands Dependencies Survey (FIDS) mapped it from the ground in 1947. Named by the FIDS for Erich Barkow, German meteorologist and member of the German Antarctic Expedition, 1911–12, under Filchner.

See also
Mount Heer, 3 nautical miles (6 km) north of Mount Barkow

References

External links

Mountains of Palmer Land